Flight 206 may refer to:

China Airlines Flight 206, crashed on 12 August 1970
Garuda Indonesia Flight 206, hijacked on 28 March 1981
Philippine Airlines Flight 206, crashed on 26 June 1987
Comair Flight 206, broke up on 1 March 1988

0206